Muriel Pauline Bamblett  is a Yorta Yorta and Dja Dja Wurrung advocate for Aboriginal child welfare in Victoria and Australia.

Biography 
Bamblett has been the chief executive of Victorian Aboriginal Child Care Agency (VACCA), since 1999. She is also an adjunct professor in the School of Social Work and Social Policy at La Trobe University. From 1998 to 2008 she was the chair of the Secretariat of National Aboriginal and Islander Child Care (SNAICC).

Bamblett is a member of the Aboriginal Treaty Working Group; Aboriginal Family Violence Steering Committee; Victorian Children's Council; Aboriginal Justice Forum; and the Aboriginal Community Elders Service. From 2009 to 2011 she was a member of the board of the Northern Territory Inquiry into Child Protection. She was elected to the Victorian First Peoples' Assembly in November 2019.

Recognition 
In 2019, Bamblett was awarded the Order of Australia for distinguished service to the Indigenous community of Victoria as an advocate for the self-determination and cultural rights of children.

Bamblett also received the Centenary of Federation Medal; the Robin Clark Memorial Award for Inspirational Leadership in the Field of Child and Family Welfare; and the Women's Electoral Lobby Inaugural Vida Goldstein Award. She appears on the Victorian Honour Roll of Women. In 2017 she was awarded an honorary degree of Doctor of Letters in Social Work by the University of Sydney in recognition of her outstanding contribution to Aboriginal child and family welfare.

References

Living people
Year of birth missing (living people)
Officers of the Order of Australia
Academic staff of La Trobe University
Recipients of the Centenary Medal
Indigenous Australians in Victoria (Australia)